Bernhardt T. Wall (December 30, 1872 – February 9, 1956) was an American historian and lithographic illustrator. He designed more than 5,000 comic cards, and became known as the "Postcard King". Many were "patriotic" cards, and American "propaganda" cards printed during World War I. After Wall visited Colorado, Nevada and California in 1915, he produced much work of western themes with small towns, Indians and cowboys. Wall worked with a variety of publishers over his career, most notably Valentine & Sons, Bergman, Barton and Spooner, International Art Co., the Illustrated Postal Card Co., Gibson Art Co., and J.I. Austen.

Wall also did illustrations with collegiate themes including postcards and other cards, for Princeton, Cornell, the University of Pennsylvania.

References

External links

 Inventory of the Bernhardt Wall Collection at Cushing Memorial Library  

1872 births
1956 deaths
American lithographers